Berglind Ásgeirsdóttir (born 15 January 1955 in Ólafsvík) is an Icelandic diplomat. From 2016 to 2020 she has been Iceland's ambassador to the Russian Federation.

From March 2011 to August 2016 she served as Icelandic ambassador to France, Italy, Spain and North Africa. She was previously Deputy Secretary-General of the OECD. She was at this post since September 2002 and among her responsibilities were the areas of education, health, labour and social policy and public communication. In 2020, Árni Þór Sigurðsson succeeded her as ambassador to Russia.

Before she was appointed to the OECD, Berglind was the Secretary-General of the Nordic Council from 1996 to 1999 and the Secretary-General in the Ministry of Social Affairs in Iceland from 1988 to 1996 and again from 1999 to 2002. From 2006 to 2007, Berglind was the head of the trading office at the Foreign ministry in Iceland.

References

External links
Berglind's biography at the website of OECD

Living people
Berglind Asgeirsdottir
Berglind Asgeirsdottir
Berglind Asgeirsdottir
Berglind Asgeirsdottir
Berglind Asgeirsdottir
1955 births
Ambassadors of Iceland to Azerbaijan
Icelandic women ambassadors
Ambassadors of Iceland to Russia